Dan Singer (born December 20, 1971), known professionally as Danny Diablo and Lord Ezec, is an American hardcore punk and hip hop vocalist. He is a current member of underground hip hop acts The ShotBlockers, KAOS 13 and FTW, and a founding member of hardcore bands Crown of Thornz, Skarhead, and Icepick, which gained him success on the New York hardcore scene.

Early life
Born in Harlem, New York, Dan Singer is the son of a Brooklyn-born Polish-Jewish police sergeant father and a Puerto Rican homemaker mother from the East River Houses of Spanish Harlem.

Music career

Bands 
Singer formed New York hardcore band Crown of Thornz in 1994 with former Breakdown guitarist Mike Dijan, drummer Dimi, and bassists Steve O'Brien and Franklin Rhi. In 1995, the band released their debut EP Train Yard Blues on Equal Vision Records, dedicating it to Singer's younger brother David, who had committed suicide the previous year. The following year the group released Mentally Vexed. In 1998, the band began a hiatus. In 2013, Crown of Thornz reunited for Ieperfest in Belgium, This Is Hardcore in Philadelphia, and a North American tour with Rancid and The Transplants.

While Crown of Thornz was on hiatus, Singer decided to set a new trend with his street blend of hardcore, metal, hip hop and punk, founding a new music genre he calls thugcore, with the band Skarhead. The band consisted of Madball's guitarists Brian "Mitts" Daniels and Hoya Roc, former White Trash bassist Aaron "White Owl" Collins, Murphy's Law's and  Misfits' drummer Eric "Goat" Arce, and Puerto Rican Mike from District 9. Skarhead's debut Drugs, Money & Sex EP was released in 1997. The band soon signed to Victory Records for the release of the New York hardcore record Kings at Crime, which hit stores in 1999. The band also had success with their sophomore LP Drugs, Music & Sex, released in 2009. In 2011, European label I Scream Records released the album Dreams Don't Die, Skarhead's tribute to some of Singer's favorite bands from the era between 1986 and 1989.

In 1996, Singer collaborated with Jamey Jasta to form the metalcore band Icepick, which served as a side project of Hatebreed, along with their bandmates Derek Kerswill, Wayne Lozinak and Frank Novinec. The group remained virtually stagnant until the song "Born to Crush You" appeared on UFC: Ultimate Beat Downs, Vol. 1 in August 2004. Former UFC heavyweight champion Andrei Arlovski frequently used their song "Onward to Victory" as his entrance music for fights. Icepick's debut album, Violent Epiphany, was released on April 18, 2006 under Jasta's record label Stillborn Records.

Singer's current band is The Wilding Incident, which also features Jimmy Williams of Nausea and Maximum Penalty.

Solo 
Singer's first solo recording began with "D.R.E.A.M." by The Transplants, which led him to sign with Travis Barker of Blink-182's LaSalle Records for the 2005 release of his Hardcore 4 Life EP. Diablo included some of its tracks on Thugcore 4 Life record released in 2007, featuring the Tim Armstrong-produced track "Living By The Gun". His friendship with Armstrong continued, and he moved to Epitaph Records and signed with Tim's Hellcat Records to release his sophomore solo album International Hardcore Superstar in 2009, with guest appearances by La Coka Nostra members, Vinnie Paz, Sick Jacken and Tim himself.

In early 2012, Singer founded his own independent record label, ILL-ROC Records and released his third solo album, The Blood Of Eden, which featured Madchild, Bizarre, Adil Omar, and the ILL-ROC roster. He went to Paris and released his fourth solo album, Dollerz Make Sense, in 2016 with label Knives Out Records.

Production 
Singer has made vocal appearances on releases by Ceekay Jones, Jay R, Grizz, and Prince Metropolitan.

Discography

Studio albums
 2007 - Thugcore 4 Life
 2009 - International Hardcore Superstar
 2012 - The Blood of Eden
 2016 - Doller Make Sense
 2017 - The Crackson Heights Project
2019 - Diablo's Way Mixtape

Extended plays 
 2005 - Hardcore 4 Life

Compilation albums 
 2003 - The Street CD Volume 1
 2005 - Street C.D. Volume # 2
 2008 - Hardcore 4 The Coldhearted
 2016 - Force 5 Records Mixtape Vol. 1

Vs series 
 2008 - When Worlds Collide (w/ The Vendetta)

Collaborative albums 

2016 - The World Is Fucked (w/ Skriptkeeper & Tony Slippaz as FTW)
2020 - Devils & Demons (w/Mars)
2021 - Spictacular (w/S.P.I.C)

Guest appearances

References

External links

Living people
American people of Polish-Jewish descent
American people of Puerto Rican descent
People from East Harlem
American male singers
Rap rock musicians
Suburban Noize Records artists
Underground rappers
Equal Vision Records artists
Rappers from Manhattan
Hellcat Records artists
1971 births
21st-century American rappers
21st-century American male musicians